The Houston Astros 1976 season was a season in American baseball. The team finished third in the National League West with a record of 80–82, 22 games behind the first-place Cincinnati Reds.

Offseason 
 October 24, 1975: The Astros traded players to be named later to the Cincinnati Reds for Joaquín Andújar. The Astros completed the trade by sending Luis Sánchez and Carlos Alfonso (minors) to the Reds on December 12.
 December 6, 1975: Milt May, Dave Roberts and Jim Crawford were traded by the Astros to the Detroit Tigers for Leon Roberts, Terry Humphrey, Gene Pentz and Mark Lemongello.

Regular season

Season standings

Record vs. opponents

Notable transactions 
 June 6, 1976: Terry Humphrey and Mike Barlow were traded by the Astros to the California Angels for Ed Herrmann.
 June 8, 1976: 1976 Major League Baseball draft
Floyd Bannister was drafted by the Houston Astros in the 1st round (1st pick).
Gary Rajsich was drafted by the Astros in the 11th round.
Bert Roberge was drafted by the Astros in the 17th round.

Roster

Player stats

Batting

Starters by position 
Note: Pos = Position; G = Games played; AB = At bats; H = Hits; Avg. = Batting average; HR = Home runs; RBI = Runs batted in

Other batters 
Note: G = Games played; AB = At bats; H = Hits; Avg. = Batting average; HR = Home runs; RBI = Runs batted in

Pitching

Starting pitchers 
Note: G = Games pitched; IP = Innings pitched; W = Wins; L = Losses; ERA = Earned run average; SO = Strikeouts

Other pitchers 
Note: G = Games pitched; IP = Innings pitched; W = Wins; L = Losses; ERA = Earned run average; SO = Strikeouts

Relief pitchers 
Note: G = Games pitched; W = Wins; L = Losses; SV = Saves; ERA = Earned run average; SO = Strikeouts

Farm system

References

External links
1976 Houston Astros season at Baseball Reference

Houston Astros seasons
Houston Astros season
Houston Astro